Aegean Records is an independent record label founded by George Michael and Andros Georgiou in January 1991. The label was set up after Michael broke from Sony Music after his court case, which he eventually lost. Andros Georgiou became the managing director of the label.

The artists either signed or previously signed to Aegean Records include:

George Michael
Trigger 
Primitiva  
Joanna Bryant    
Bassey Walker 
Toby Bourke  
Mutya Buena 
Surreala

Georgiou and Michael founded Aegean Net Ltd on 15 November 1996, which was the internet business of Aegean Records. Michael and Georgiou were directors of the business, although Georgiou resigned as a director on 25 January 2000, he then became managing director of mezzmusic.com. In May 1997 Aegean became the first European record label to adopt the Liquid Audio secure electronic music-delivery system via www.aegean.net, which was launched one year before BowieNet, and 11 years before Spotify.

Aegean.net was the first artist-owned website to allow fans to:

Chat with music artists (including Michael)
Purchase merchandise
Purchase and download music (via Liquid Audio)
Audio/video streaming (via RealVideo)
Join the first online-only fan club
Receive news and updates from Michael and other Aegean Records artists

See also
 List of record labels

Notes

External links
Archived website of aegeanrecords.com 
Archived website of aegean.net

Record labels established in 1991
British independent record labels
George Michael